The men's Swedish system team was an artistic gymnastics event held as part of the Gymnastics at the 1920 Summer Olympics programme. It was the second and final appearance of the event, which was one of three team gymnastics events held in 1920 (along with the free system team event and the all-around team event. Three teams competed, for a total of 73 gymnasts.

Results

References

Sources
 
 

Gymnastics at the 1920 Summer Olympics